Hold Your Breath is a 1924 American silent comedy film directed by Scott Sidney and starring Dorothy Devore, Walter Hiers, and Tully Marshall.

Cast

Preservation
Copies of Hold Your Breath are maintained in the collections of the Library of Congress, UCLA Film and Television Archive, George Eastman Museum Motion Picture Collection, and other film archives.

References

Bibliography
 Donald W. McCaffrey and Christopher P. Jacobs. Guide to the Silent Years of American Cinema. Greenwood Publishing, 1999.

External links

Commentary and stills at silentsaregolden.com

1924 films
1924 comedy films
1920s English-language films
American silent feature films
Silent American comedy films
Films directed by Scott Sidney
American black-and-white films
Producers Distributing Corporation films
1920s American films